The Bloody Fight or Bloody Duel: Life And Death , released in France as La Vengeance du léopard  is a 1972 Hong Kong action film directed by Ng Tin Chi.

Cast
Chen Kuan Tai
Ingrid Hu
Lau Laan Ying
Alan Tang
Pai Ying
Eddie Ko Hung
Goo Man Chung
Fong Yau
Tang Ching
Chan Lau

External links
 Bloody Duel: Life and Death at HKcinemamagic.com

1972 films
1970s action films
Hong Kong martial arts films
1970s Mandarin-language films
1972 martial arts films
1970s Hong Kong films